Causse Méjean is a limestone plateau in the Lozère department, in southern France. It is a part of The Causses and the Cévennes, Mediterranean agro-pastoral Cultural Landscape UNESCO World Heritage Site.

Communes
Causse Méjan is part of 13 communes in Lozère: 
 Hures-la-Parade
 Meyrueis
 Les Vignes
 Montbrun
 Florac
 Le Mas-Saint-Chély
 Gatuzières
 Fraissinet-de-Fourques
 Vebron
 Saint-Laurent-de-Trèves
 Le Rozier
 Saint-Pierre-des-Tripiers
 La Malène

See also

 Causses
 Gorges du Tarn
 Cévennes National Park

References 

Landforms of Lozère
Plateaus of Metropolitan France